Lázaro Vargas Álvarez  (born January 18, 1964) is a Cuban baseball player and Olympic gold medalist.

Vargas is a two time gold medalist for baseball, winning at the 1992 Summer Olympics and the 1996 Summer Olympics. He is one of the best third baseman players in the Cuban baseball

References 
 
 

1964 births
Living people
Olympic baseball players of Cuba
Olympic gold medalists for Cuba
Olympic medalists in baseball
Medalists at the 1992 Summer Olympics
Medalists at the 1996 Summer Olympics
Baseball players at the 1992 Summer Olympics
Baseball players at the 1996 Summer Olympics
Pan American Games gold medalists for Cuba
Baseball players at the 1987 Pan American Games
Baseball players at the 1991 Pan American Games
Pan American Games medalists in baseball
Central American and Caribbean Games gold medalists for Cuba
Competitors at the 1986 Central American and Caribbean Games
Central American and Caribbean Games medalists in baseball
Medalists at the 1991 Pan American Games